The Debussy Film: Impressions of the French Composer is a 1965 British television film about Claude Debussy. It was written by Melvyn Bragg and Ken Russell, with Russell directing.

It was the first collaboration between Ken Russell and Oliver Reed. Russell cast Reed after seeing him in The System. It was the second to last film Russell made for BBC's Monitor. Always on Sunday would be the last.

Plot
A film company shoots a dramatised account of the life of the French composer Claude Debussy

Cast
Oliver Reed as Claude Debussy
Vladek Sheybal as Director/Pierre Louys
Annette Robertson as Gaby
Iza Teller as Madame Bardac
Penny Service as Lily

Production
Debussy's estate disliked the film and prevented repeat screenings.

References

External links
The Debussy Film at IMDb
The Debussy FIlm at BFI Screenonline
Article on film at Diabolique Magazine
Article on film at Dangerous Mind
The Debussy Film at Letterbox DVD

1965 television films
1965 films
Films about composers
Films directed by Ken Russell
1960s English-language films